The Copperneedle River originates within the northern Hearne Domain, Western Churchill province of the Churchill craton, the northwest section of the Canadian Shield in Nunavut's Kivalliq Region.

Copperneedle River is populated with Arctic char. The portion of the river near Southern Lake is part of the Beverly and Qamanirjuaq caribou range.

See also
List of rivers of Nunavut

References

Rivers of Kivalliq Region
Tributaries of Hudson Bay